Philippine Swimming Incorporated (PSI) is the national governing body of aquatic sports in the Philippines. PSI currently oversees swimming, diving, and water polo. It is accredited by the Philippine Olympic Committee (POC). It was accredited by World Aquatics until December 22, 2022.

History
Philippine Swimming Incorporated (PSI) was formerly known as the Philippine Amateur Swimming Association (PASA).

Around the early 2000s, PASA was led by president Monchito Ilagan who was elected in 2002. In 2004, a leadership crisis arose after Mark Joseph claimed the presidency in an election.

The Philippine Olympic Committee affirmed the installation of Joseph as PASA president in 2005 as a result of an alleged agreement between him and Ilagan. This includes the holding of an election within 90 days. Election was claimed to have occurred in 2005 or 2006.

PASA acchieved feats under Joseph, qualifying five swimmers for the 2008 Summer Olympics. In the 2007 Southeast Asian Games the country won eight gold medals. However Joseph's administration also had further controversies. The federation often came into conflict with the Philippine Swimming League (PSL) of Nikki Coseteng and Susan Papa and Joseph faced graft allegations involving the disbursement of government funds.

Joseph would head abroad over health concerns, with his secretary general Lani Velasco taking over as Officer in Charge. She would get elected as president after an election sanctioned by the Philippine Olympic Committee in February 2018.

Under Velasco, swimmers from rival group PSL, were able to take part in the PSI sanctioned 2019 PSI Grand Prix. The Philippines would end its gold medal drought at the Southeast Asian Games since 2009, with a medal by James Deiparine in the 2019 edition hosted at home. Velasco would win a new four year term on April 2022.

In December 3, 2022, the FINA revoked its recognition of the membership board of the PSI, and instituted a stabilization committee in its place after accruing several complaints over its governance. On December 15, FINA, now known as World Aquatics, withdrew recognition of the PSI itself. The stabilization committee is set to recommend a new federation to replace the PSI.

Sports
Philippine Swimming covers several water sports including swimming, water polo, diving, open water and artistic swimming.

Presidents
Monchito Ilagan (2002–2005)
Mark Joseph (2005–2018)
Lani Velasco (2018–Present)

See also
 List of Filipino records in swimming
 List of Olympic medalists for the Philippines
 Philippines men's national water polo team
 Philippines women's national water polo team

Notes

References

External links
Philippine Swimming Inc.

Philippines
Philippines
Swimming in the Philippines
Aquatics in the Philippines
Swimming